The 1921 Stanford football team represented Stanford University in the 1921 college football season. They were coached by Eugene Van Gent in his only season as head coach. The team played most of its home games at the 15,000-seat Stanford Field while construction on the new 60,000-seat Stanford Stadium was being completed. Stanford Stadium officially opened for the final game, the Big Game against California, in which the Bears defeated Stanford 42–7.

Schedule

References

Stanford
Stanford Cardinal football seasons
Stanford football